Industriales began to make a habit of Cuban National Series titles during the 1964-65 season, the fourth installment of Cuba's new post-revolutionary amateur baseball league. The team, representing Havana, won its third straight title. For the first time, each team played an equal number of games (39).

Standings

Notes and references

 (Note - text is printed in a white font on a white background, depending on browser used.)
Granjeros had been named Azucareros prior to this season.

Cuban National Series seasons
Cuban National Series
1964 in Cuban sport
1965 in Cuban sport